Varazdat Harutyunyan (also Harutiunian, ; 29 November 1909 – 20 March 2008) was an Armenian academic, architect and writer.

Biography 
Harutyunyan was born in the Ottoman Empire, in the town of Van, but he and his family were forced to flee into Russian territory during the Armenian genocide. They settled first in Tbilisi and then in Yerevan. In 1946, he obtained his Ph.D., and then Doctor of Science in architecture. In 1964, he became a professor of history. In 1996 he was elected Academician of the National Academy of Sciences of Armenia. In Armenia, he was also president of the Society for Protection of Historical Monuments.

He was the author of over 40 books and over 800 articles, mostly on Armenian architecture.

References

External links
Life of Academician Varazdat Harutyunyan 

1909 births
2008 deaths
20th-century Armenian architects
20th-century Armenian historians
People from Van, Turkey
Communist Party of the Soviet Union members
National Polytechnic University of Armenia alumni
Recipients of the Order of the Red Banner of Labour
Emigrants from the Ottoman Empire to the Russian Empire
Armenian genocide survivors
Armenians from the Ottoman Empire
Soviet architects
Soviet historians